Events in the year 1856 in Costa Rica.

Incumbents
President: Juan Rafael Mora Porras

Events
March 20 - Battle of Santa Rosa
April 11 - Campaign of 1856–57: Second Battle of Rivas

Births

Deaths
April 11 - Juan Santamaria

 
1850s in Costa Rica